The Texas Rangers Major League Baseball (MLB) franchise was established in 1961 as the Washington Senators, an expansion team awarded to Washington, D.C., after the old Washington Senators team of the American League moved to Minnesota and became the Twins. The new Senators remained in Washington through 1971. In 1972, the team moved to Arlington, Texas, where it became the Texas Rangers. In the franchise's history, 11 general managers (GMs) have been employed to oversee day-to-day operations.

Majority owners

Presidents of Baseball Operations and General managers

Notes

References

Owners
Lists of Major League Baseball owners and executives